François III, Count of La Rochefoucauld, prince of Marcillac, count of Roucy and baron of Verteuil (1521 - 24 August 1572) was a French courtier and soldier, serving as gentleman-in-ordinary to the king's chamber. He was a friend of Charles de Téligny and Louise de Coligny, serving as one of the witnesses to their marriage, whilst his humour and intelligence rendered him a favourite of Henry II of France and Charles IX of France. He is also notable as one of the Protestant leaders killed in the St. Bartholomew's Day massacre.

Life
He was born in Paris as son of count François II de La Rochefoucauld. He became a brilliant soldier, fighting with distinction under Henry II of France during the first three French civil wars. According to Brantôme in his youth he found favour in Henry II's court, becoming a knight in the Order of the King, fighting in the king's entourage and having quite a busy military career. In 1552 he took part in the siege of Metz as captain of light cavalry. He and constable de Montmorency were captured at the Battle of Saint-Quentin on 10 August 1557 - de La Rochefoucauld was then a lieutenant leading a company of gendarmes raised by the Duke of Lorraine. In 1550, his position having become untenable due to his Protestantism, he considered leaving the French court and moving to Germany, but Francis II's death and Catherine de Medici's entreaties led him to abandon this plan.

He became leader of the Huguenot party in 1562 and from then on took part in all the important battles of the first three French Wars of Religion. He fought for the House of Bourbon against the House of Lorraine. The Prince de Condé was his brother-in-law (de La Rochefoucauld was married to Charlotte de Roucy and the Prince to Éléonore de Roucy, both women being daughters of Charles de Roye, count of Roucy). He took part in the blockade of Paris before protecting the Prince in Normandy. He fought in the Battle of Dreux, facing the battalion commanded by constable Anne, and the Siege of Orléans, capturing Gergeau. He took part in the bataille de Saint-Denis (10 November 1567) before accompanying the prince de Condé to Touraine.

He and the Prince fought as part of a vast cavalry force at the Surprise of Meaux on 28 September 1567. de La Rochefoucauld also fought at the Siege of Chartres and raised a huge army to save the prince de Condé at La Rochelle, before accompanying him to Languedoc to join forces with Jacques II de Crussol's forces. On 13 March 1569 he fought at the Battle of Jarnac, in which the prince de Condé was killed. He then fought under Henry of Navarre, the prince's paternal nephew, at La Roche-l'Abeille. He also took part in the assaults on Beaugency and Pons and the sieges of Nontron, Lusignan and Poitiers in summer 1569 before coming to the assistance of Châtellerault and fighting at Port-de-Piles and on 3 October 1569 at Moncontour.

After the peace of August 1570, he returned to the royal court, where his pleasant conversation and good spirits made him a confidant of the 20-year-old king Charles IX. He was in Paris the day before the St Bartholomew's Day Massacre and so Charles IX tried to convince him to move to the Louvre and suggested he move in with his valets de chambre, but de la Rochefoucauld replied "their feet stink". On the day of the massacre the Catholics found de La Rochefoucauld and brought him out of the palace, killing him with other Protestant noblemen in the neighbouring streets. His body was stripped and thrown into the Seine.

Marriage and issue 

His first marriage was to Sylvie Pic de la Mirandole, descendant of an elder brother of the philosopher Giovanni Pico della Mirandola. Their only child was François IV de La Rochefoucauld. On 31 May 1557 he remarried to Charlotte de Roye (1537-1569), countess of Roucy, sister in law to the prince de Condé, with whom he had six children, who all bore the name and coat arms of Roye before that of La Rochefoucauld in obedience to Charlotte and Francois' marriage contract.

References

Bibliography 
  Jules Delaborde, « François de la Rochefoucauld », Paris, Bulletin historique et littéraire. Société de l'histoire du protestantisme français, volume XXIII, second series, ninth year, 1874, p. 434-451.
  P. Moret de la Fayole, Histoire généalogique de la maison de Roucy et de Roye, Coustelier, Francois, 1675, chapter XXV.

1521 births
1572 deaths
French people of the French Wars of Religion
Nobility from Paris
People murdered in Paris
16th-century French military personnel
Francois 3
Military personnel from Paris